Monnes is a commune in the Aisne department in Hauts-de-France in northern France. The village is situated 55 kilometers (34.2 miles) away from Laon, the department capital of Aisne.

Population

See also
Communes of the Aisne department

References

Communes of Aisne
Aisne communes articles needing translation from French Wikipedia